
Gmina Michałowice is a rural gmina (administrative district) in Pruszków County, Masovian Voivodeship, in east-central Poland. Its seat is the village of Michałowice, which lies approximately 4 kilometres (2 mi) east of Pruszków and 11 km (6 mi) south-west of Warsaw.

Villages
Gmina Michałowice contains the villages and settlements of Komorów, Michałowice, Nowa Wieś, Opacz Kolonia, Opacz Mała, Pęcice, Pęcice Małe, Reguły, Sokołów and Suchy Las.

Neighbouring gminas
Gmina Michałowice is bordered by Warsaw, by the towns of Piastów and Pruszków, and by the gminas of Brwinów, Nadarzyn and Raszyn.

References
Polish official population figures 2006

Michalowice
Pruszków County